Hilary Bailey (19 September 1936 – 19 January 2017) was a British writer, critic and editor.

Life 
Bailey attended Newnham College, Cambridge, where she was a founder-member of the Cambridge University Women's Union. She was born in Bromley, Kent.

Her books include Polly Put the Kettle On, Mrs Mulvaney, Hannie Richards and All the Days of My Life, with a heroine who suffers the fate of all women who step away from what is expected of them. She wrote a biography of Vera Brittain, and sequels to Jane Eyre and The Turn of the Screw, a novel called Miles and Flora, which takes place some time after the original and resurrects one of the main characters. Bailey reviewed chiefly for The Guardian, edited volumes 7–10 of the New Worlds Quarterly series, and was an uncredited coauthor of The Black Corridor (1969) with Michael Moorcock, to whom she was married from 1962 to 1978. Two of Bailey's science fiction short stories appeared in anthologies edited by Terry Carr. The anthology titles are On Our Way to the Future (1970) and Universe 5 (1974).

She was editing North Sea Island, the sequel to her book Fifty-First State when she died.

Bailey had three children, Sophie, Kate and Max and three grandchildren Alex, Tom and Bobby.

Books
 Polly Put the Kettle On (1975)
 Mrs. Mulvaney (1978)
 All the Days of My Life (1984)
 Hannie Richards, Or, The Intrepid Adventures of a Restless Wife (1985)
 The Giant Book of Stories (1986)
 Vera Brittain: The Story of the Woman Who Wrote Testament of Youth (non-fiction) (1987)
 As Time Goes By (1988)
 A Stranger to Herself (1989) (aka She Was a Dreadful Woman)
 In Search of Love, Money and Revenge (1990)
 The Cry from Street to Street (1992)
 Cassandra: Princess of Troy (1993)
 Frankenstein's Bride: The Sequel to Mary Shelly's Frankenstein (1995)
 Miles and Flora: A Sequel to Henry James' The Turn of the Screw (1997)
 Mrs. Rochester: A Sequel to Charlotte Brontë's Jane Eyre (1997)
 Elizabeth and Lily (1997)
 After the Cabaret (1998)
 Connections (2000)
 Fifty-First State (2008)
 Diana: The Ghost Biography (2009)
 Strange Adventures of Charlotte Holmes (2012)
 Did We Meet on Grub Street?: A Publishing Miscellany (2014)

Short stories 

 Breakdown (1963)
 The Fall of Frenchy Steiner (1964) 
 In Reason's Ear (1965) (as Pippin Graham)
 Be Good Sweet Man (1966)
 Devil of a Drummer (1967)
 The Little Victims (1967)
 Dr. Gelabius (1968)
 Agatha Blue (1970)
 Dogman of Islington (1970)
 Twenty-Four Letters from Underneath the Earth (1971)
 A Chronicle of Blackton (1972)
 Bella Goes to the Dark Tower (1973)
 On Board the Good Ship Venus (1974)
 The Ramparts (1974)
 Sisters (1976)
 Everything Blowing Up: An Adventure of Una Persson, Heroine of Time and Space (1980) (aka Everything Blowing Up: An Adventure of Una Persson, Heroine of Space and Time and Everything Blowing Up)

References

External links
 Hilary Bailey at Fantastic Fiction
 
 Hilary Bailey at The Science Fiction Encyclopedia

1936 births
2017 deaths
British fantasy writers
British science fiction writers
Science fiction editors
Women science fiction and fantasy writers
People from Bromley
British women novelists
20th-century British novelists
20th-century British women writers
21st-century British novelists
21st-century British women writers
British biographers
British speculative fiction editors
Women biographers